Eddiceton is an unincorporated community in Franklin County, Mississippi, United States.

Eddiceton is located on the former Mississippi Central Railroad and was once home to a pine lumber mill.

A post office operated under the name Eddiceton from 1907 to 1983.

The Eddiceton Bridge, which is listed on the National Register of Historic Places, is located in Eddiceton.

References

Unincorporated communities in Franklin County, Mississippi
Unincorporated communities in Mississippi